Ancistrus nudiceps is a species of catfish in the family Loricariidae. It is native to South America, where it occurs in the Takutu River basin in the upper Branco River drainage in Guyana. The species reaches 7.9 cm (3.1 inches) SL.

References 

nudiceps
Fish described in 1849
Fish of Guyana
Catfish of South America